The Military Order of Christ is the former order of Knights Templar as it was reconstituted in Portugal. Before 1910, it was known as the Royal Military Order of Our Lord Jesus Christ, and the Order of the Knights of Our Lord Jesus Christ. It was founded in 1319, with the protection of King Denis of Portugal, after the Templars were abolished on 22 March 1312 by the papal bull, Vox in excelso, issued by Pope Clement V. King Denis refused to pursue and persecute the former knights as had occurred in most of the other sovereign states under the political influence of the Catholic Church.

Heavily swayed by Philip IV of France, Pope Clement had the Knights Templar annihilated throughout France and most of Europe on charges of heresy, but Denis revived the Templars of Tomar as the Order of Christ, largely for their aid during the Reconquista and in the reconstruction of Portugal after the wars. Denis negotiated with Clement's successor, John XXII, for recognition of the new order and its right to inherit the Templar assets and property. This was granted in a papal bull, Ad ea ex quibus, on 14 March 1319.

There exists also a parallel Supreme Order of Christ of the Holy See, the Order of Christ of the House of Orléans-Braganza, and the Order of Christ of Kongo.

History 

The order's origins lie in the Knights Templar, founded circa 1118. The Templars were persecuted by the king of France and eventually disbanded by the pope in 1312. King Dinis I of Portugal created the Order of Christ in 1319 for those knights who survived their mass slaughter throughout Europe. In Portugal, the Order of Christ accumulated great riches and power during the Age of Discoveries.

In 1789, Queen Maria I of Portugal secularized the order. In 1910, with the end of the Portuguese monarchy, the order was extinguished. However, in 1917, the order was revived, with its Grand Master to be the President of Portugal. The Military Order of Christ, together with the Military Orders of Aviz and of St. James of the Sword, formed the group of the "Ancient Military Orders", governed by a chancellor and a council of eight members, and appointed by the President of the Republic to assist him as Grand Master in all the order's administrative matters. The Order can be conferred for outstanding services to the Republic on military officers, and, despite its name, on civilians (including foreigners as well as Portuguese citizens) and on members of: Parliament or other branches of government, the diplomatic corps, the Courts of Justice, the Civil Service, and other public authorities.

Grades and badges
The Order of Christ, as awarded by the Portuguese government today, comes in six classes: 
 Grand Collar (GCol), which wears grand collar, the badge of the Order on a sash on the right shoulder, and the star of the Order in gold on the left chest. This rank was introduced in 2021.
 Grand Cross (GCC), which wears the badge of the Order on a sash on the right shoulder, and the star of the Order in gold on the left chest;
 Grand Officer (GOC), which wears the badge of the Order on a necklet, and the star of the Order in gold on the left chest;
 Commander (ComC), which wears the badge of the Order on a necklet, and the star of the Order in silver on the left chest;
 Officer (OC), which wears the badge of the Order on a ribbon with rosette on the left chest;
 Knight (CvC) or Dame (DmC), which wears the badge of the Order on a plain ribbon on the left chest.

Insignia
 The grand collar is formed by simple crosses of the Order, alternating and linked with armillary spheres, gilded, suspended by a double chain of simple links, gilded; in the center, two interlocked branches of quercus coccifera, gilded; the necklace, all in gold, has the cross of the Order hanging, profiled in gold, surrounded by a festoon, of open cut, of laurel leaves with its fruits, tied with crossed ribbons on the tops and sides, also in gold.
 The badge of the Order is a gilt cross with enamel, similar to the Order's emblem illustrated here, but with a longer lower arm. During the monarchy there were separate badges for civil and military knights: civil knights wore a badge similar to the modern version, but with the Sacred Heart of Christ above it; military knights had a completely different insignia, this being a gilt, blue and white enamelled Maltese Cross with white enamelled oval shields (each bearing a design similar to the Coat of arms of Portugal minus the red border) between the arms of the cross, the whole surrounded by a wreath of palm; the central disc was in white enamel, with a miniature of the modern badge in it; the badge was topped by a gilt crown.
 The star of the Order has 22 asymmetrical arms of rays, in gilt for Grand Cross and Grand Officer, and in silver for Commander. The central disc is in white enamel, with a miniature of the modern badge in it. During the monarchy the Sacred Heart of Christ was placed at the top of the star.
 The ribbon of the Order is plain red.

People associated with the Order of Christ

Grand Masters 
 Henry the Navigator (Grand Master)
 Manuel I (Grand Master)
 Infante Ferdinand (Grand Master)
 Sebastian of Portugal (Grand Master)

Others 
 Vasco da Gama (also to the Order of Santiago before)
 Pedro Álvares Cabral
 João Gonçalves Zarco
 Gonçalo Velho Cabral
 Bartolomeu Dias
 D. Beatrice
 Francisco de Almeida
 Miguel Corte-Real
 Gaspar Corte-Real
 Tristão da Cunha
 Martim Afonso de Sousa
 João de Castro
 Cristóvão da Gama
 Tomé de Sousa
 Fernão de Magalhães, also known as Ferdinand Magellan (also to the Order of Santiago)
 Vicente Sodré
 Damião de Góis
 Pedro Teixeira
 Alexandre de Gusmão
 Alexandre Rodrigues Ferreira
 Henrique Dias
 António Filipe Camarão
 Jácome Ratton
 Albert Coyette
 Louis-Nicolas Davout
 Jean-Baptiste Bessières
 Albert Guille
 Guillaume Delcourt
 Ângelo Moniz da Silva Ferraz, Baron of Uruguaiana

Locations associated with the Order of Christ 
Castro Marim (seat of the order before 1357)
Convento de Cristo
Belém Tower
Castle of Almourol
Castle of Monsanto
Castle of Castelo Branco
Sagres (death place of Prince Henry)

Entities using the cross of the order in their insignia

Brazilian Football Confederation
Clube de Futebol Os Belenenses (Portugal)
Futebol Clube Cesarense
Madeira
National Corps of Scouts - Portuguese Catholic Scouting
Olympic Committee of Portugal
Portuguese Air Force
Portuguese Athletic Federation
Portuguese Football Federation
Portuguese Navy
Portuguese Roller Sports Federation
Flag of the city of São Paulo (Brazil)
Clube de Desportos de Vasco da Gama (Goa, Índia)
CR Vasco da Gama (Rio de Janeiro, Brazil)

See also
Honorific orders of Portugal
Order of Christ (Holy See)
History of the Order of Christ

Notes

References

Bibliography
 GUIMARÃES, J. Vieira, A Ordem de Cristo, Lisboa, I.N., 1936
 OLIVAL, Fernanda, The Military Orders and the Portuguese Expansion (15th to 17th Centuries), Portuguese Studies Review Monographs, Vol. 3, Peterborough: Baywolf Press and The Portuguese Studies Review, 2018.

 
1318 establishments in Europe
14th-century establishments in Portugal
Knights Templar